{{Infobox journal
| title         = LEARN Journal
| image         = 
| caption       = 
| former_name   = Language Institute Journal (2003-2009, 2012)
| abbreviation  = LEARN Journal
| discipline    = Linguistics
| language      = English
| editor        = Supakorn Phoocharoensil
| publisher     = Language Institute, Thammasat University
| country       = Thailand
| history       = 2013–Present
| frequency     = Biannually
| openaccess    = Yes
| license       = 
| impact        = 
| impact-year   = 
| ISSN          = 2630-0672
| eISSN         = 2672-9431
| CODEN         = 
| JSTOR         = 
| LCCN          = 
| OCLC          = 
| website       = https://so04.tci-thaijo.org/index.php/LEARN/index
| link1         = 
| link1-name    = 
| link2         = 
| link2-name    = 
}}

The Language Education and Acquisition Research Network Journal is a bi-annual, peer-reviewed academic journal focused on the field of applied linguistics, particularly the study and learning of English. The journal was established in 2013 and is published by the Language Institute at Thammasat University.

History
In its current form, the Journal was previously published as the Language Institute Journal beginning in 2003. In 2013, the Journal changed its name to the Language Education and Acquisition Research Network (LEARN) Journal.

ReputationLEARN Journal'' is one of two Scopus-indexed journals that focus on language studies in Thailand.

Accessibility
The journal publishes all material in open access format.

See also
 List of education journals
 Educational psychology

References

External links
 

English-language journals
Publications established in 2013
Language education journals
Biannual journals
Thammasat University
Academic journals published in Thailand